Folorunsho or Folorunso (also spelled as  Folusho or Foluso) is a Nigerian given name of Yoruba origin meaning "''under God's protection"

Notable people include:
Folorunso Alakija, Nigerian businesswoman
Folorunso Fatukasi, American football player
Ambrose Folorunsho Alli (1929-1989), Nigerian medical professor
Folorunsho Coker, Nigerian businessman
Folusho Ajayi, Nigerian referee

References

Yoruba given names
Yoruba-language surnames